María Vinyals y Ferrés (1875–1940s), also known as the Marquise of Ayerbe, was a Spanish publicist and essayist.

Biography 

Born in the Castle of Soutomaior, province of Pontevedra, on 14 August 1875. She inherited goods from her uncles the marquises de la Vega y Armijo. She married Juan Jordán de Urríes, marquis of Ayerbe in 1896. In 1904 she published El Castillo del Marqués de Mos en Sotomayor. Vinyals, became an acquaintance of Emilia Pardo Bazán, María Barbeito and Carmen de Burgos, joined the Ateneo de Madrid in 1906. She founded the Ibero-American Centre for Female Popular Culture, an institution looking to teach girls unable to receive other kind of education. In 1909, following the decease of the marquis of Ayerbe, Vinyals married the Cuban physician Enrique Lluria. A member of the Spanish Socialist Workers' Party (PSOE), Vinyals was affiliated to the Female Socialist Aggrupation of Madrid. She wrote several columns in journals such as El Imparcial, El Fígaro, or Blanco y Negro. She dealt with the importance of female education as tool for social regeneration, she also vowed for the complementarity of man and woman in public management.

She moved to Cuba in 1919. She died in Paris during the Nazi occupation of the city in World War II.

References

Bibliography 
 
 
 
 
 
 



1875 births
1940s deaths
20th-century Spanish women writers
20th-century Spanish writers
People from Vigo (comarca)
Year of death uncertain